Gov. Samuel J. Tilden Monument is a historic funeral monument located in Cemetery of the Evergreens at New Lebanon in Columbia County, New York.  It was designed by architect Ernest Flagg (1856-1947) and built in 1895–1896.  It contains the remains of New York State Governor Samuel J. Tilden (1814-1886).  It consists of a nine and one half ton cut granite sarcophagus on a raised platform of four cut granite steps. The crypt entrance is marked by a cast-bronze gate that provides access to three brick arched crypts.

It was added to the National Register of Historic Places in 2006.

References

Monuments and memorials on the National Register of Historic Places in New York (state)
Neoclassical architecture in New York (state)
Buildings and structures completed in 1896
Buildings and structures in Columbia County, New York
Monuments and memorials in New York (state)
Sculptures by Carl Conrads
1896 sculptures
Granite sculptures in New York (state)
1896 establishments in New York (state)
National Register of Historic Places in Columbia County, New York
Governor of New York (state)